‌Rajeswari Ray (death: 20 July 2022) was an Indian actress and television presenter from Odisha. She started her career as a television presenter and then appeared in popular Odia daily soaps like Basundahara, Sanskar, Devi, Swabhiman, Unasi Kanya, Kumkum, To Pain Mun, etc. In 2008 she debuted in Ollywood through Satyameba Jayate, and later appeared in two more movies like Aare Sathi Aa and Blackmail.

Filmography

Odia films

Television

Death 
She died on 20 July 2022 in a private hospital of Bhubaneswar at 37. She was suffering from brain and lung cancer since 2019.

References

Actresses in Odia cinema
Indian film actresses
21st-century Indian actresses
Ollywood
2022 deaths
People from Balasore
Date of birth missing